Joseph Hart (born 1976) is an American artist. Originally from Peterborough, New Hampshire, he currently lives and works in Brooklyn, New York. His work has recently been exhibited at Romer Young Gallery in San Francisco, Dieu Donne, David Krut Projects and Halsey Mckay Gallery in New York, among others. Hart's work has also been included in notable group shows at the Frans Masareel Center in Belgium, Bronx Museum of the Arts and the Santa Monica Museum of Art. He has been featured in periodicals such as FlashArt, Modern Painters, Huffington Post and The New York Times. His work is in the public collections of The Rhode Island School of Design Museum, The Metropolitan Museum of Art and the San Francisco Museum of Modern Art. Hart received a BFA from the Rhode Island School of Design in 1999.

Solo & Two Person Exhibitions 
 2014 Joseph Hart & Tamara Zahaykevich, Dieu Donne, New York, NY
 2014 Dread Blush, David Krut Projects, New York, NY
 2014 Excavator, Romer Young Gallery, San Francisco, CA
 2013 Angel Error, Halsey Mckay Gallery, East Hampton, NY
 2013 Delong & Hart, Cooper Cole Gallery, Toronto, Canada
 2012 Odd Antique, Halsey Mckay at The New York Design Center, New York, NY 
 2011 Joseph Hart & Ruby Sky Stiler, Halsey Mckay Gallery, East Hampton, NY
 2010 Out of Moments, Galerie Vidal Saint-Phalle, Paris, France
 2009 Stagecrafter, David Krut Projects, New York, NY
 2007 Beautiful Balance, Galerie Vidal Saint-Phalle, Paris, France
 2006 Belief Signal, Galleri Loyal, Stockholm, Sweden

Selected group exhibitions 
 2014 Winter Show, Gallery Steinsland Berliner, Stockholm, Sweden
 2014 Volatile, Galleri Jacob Bjorn, Aarhus, Denmark
 2013 News from New York, Galleri Tom Christoffersen, Copenhagen, Denmark
 2012 Finders Keepers, Frederieke Taylor Gallery at TSA, Brooklyn, NY
 2012 Sixth Sax, Halsey Mckay Gallery, East Hampton, NY
 2011 Go Figure, Dodge Gallery, New York, NY
 2011 Incognito, Santa Monica Museum of Art, Santa Monica, CA
 2011 Cover Version LP, Brooklyn Academy of Music, Brooklyn, NY
 2010 New New York, Frans Masereel Center, Kasterlee, Belgium
 2010 Default State Network, Morgan Lehman Gallery, New York, NY
 2010 All This and Not Ordinary, Jeff Bailey Gallery, New York, NY
 2009 New Prints / Summer 2009, International Print Center, New York, NY
 2009 Subverted Genres, Sue Scott Gallery, New York, NY
 2009 With Hidden Noise, David Krut Projects, New York, NY
 2008 New Editions / Forth Estate, Klaus Von Nichtssagend Gallery, Brooklyn, NY
 2008 Cover Version, Taylor De Cordoba, Los Angeles, CA
 2008 New Talents, Art Cologne, Cologne, Germany
 2008 Accident Blackspot, Galerie Markus Winter, Berlin, Germany
 2007 Work In Progress, Galleri Magnus Aklundh, Malmo, Sweden
 2007 Here And Elsewhere, The Bronx Museum of The Arts, NY
 2006 Forth Estate Editions, Klaus Von Nichtssangend Gallery, Brooklyn, NY
 2006 CRG Presents / Klaus Gallery, CRG Gallery, New York, NY
 2006 You Have To Be Almost Gifted To Do What I Do, Alexander & Bonin, New York, NY
 2006 Don’t Abandon Ship, Allston Skirt Gallery, Boston, MA
 2005 Selected Drawings, Klaus Von Nichtssangend, Brooklyn, NY
 2005 Loyal And His Band, Galleri Loyal, Stockholm, Sweden
 2005 Greater Brooklyn, CRG Gallery, NYC

Awards and honors 
 2014, Residency Fellowship, Dieu Donne, New York, NY
 2010, Juror, Robert Blackburn Printmaking Workshop / Studio Immersion Project, New York, NY
 2010, Guest Lecture, Northeastern University / Dept. of Art & Design, Boston, MA
 2009, Guest Lecture, Maryland Institute College of Art, Baltimore, MD
 2009, North American Print Biennial, Selected Artist, Boston University, Boston, MA
 2008, Selected Artist, Art Cologne / New Talents, Cologne, Germany
 2008, Juror, Scholastic Art Awards / Division of Printmaking and Drawing, New York, NY
 2007, Selected Artist, AIM Program / The Bronx Museum of the Arts, Bronx, NY
 2006, Guest Lecture, Harvard University / Advocate Arts Presents, Cambridge, MA
 2005, Residency Fellowship, Saltonstall Foundation for The Arts, Ithaca, NY

Selected bibliography
 Miyazaki, Naoto, MONTEM Magazine #04, September, 2014
 Quicho, Alex, Free Thinkers #07, September, 2014
 Osberg, Annabel, "Kiss Idioms", Huffington Post, May, 2014
 de Cherico, Domenico, Dust Magazine, May, 2014
 Hamer Diamond, Katy, "New York Tales / Angel Error", Flash Art, August, 2013
 Russeth, Andrew, "Miami Project Arrives", Gallerist NY, 2012
 Indrisek, Scott, "Young Blood", Modern Painters, June, 2011
 Valli, Marc, "In The Broadest Sense", Elephant Magazine #5, January, 2011
 Morton, Julia, "Default State Network", City Arts, July, 2010
 Rich, Matthew, "Joseph Hart, and You", Stagecraft Catalogue, November, 2009
 McCrickard, Kate, "History Boy", Stagecraft Catalogue, November, 2009
 Hartig, Frederik, Das Gefrorene Meer No. 4, 2008
 Hendeson, Lee, "Bilocation", Border Crossing Issue #107, 2008
 Chu, Ingrid, "Accident Blackspot", Time Out New York, August, 2008
 Stern, Steven, "Joseph Hart / Fragments", Seems Books, July, 2008
 Loesser, Ernest, "Where The Pieces Fall", FV Magazine Vol. 2, 2008
 Ribas, Joao, "The Reeducation Of The Un-Artist", Here And Elsewhere catalogue, April, 2007
 Brown, NIck, "The Art of Storytelling", COLOR Magazine, October, 2006
 Stockwell, Craig, "Young Mountain", Art New England, October, 2005
 Alessandrelli, Irina Zucca, "La risposta di Brooklyn alla Grande NY", Flash Art, August, 2005
 Martin, Kristian, Amy, "Loyal And His Band", Loyal Books Vol.1, March, 2005

Notes

External links

JOSEPH HART Priority Index
"Art Seen, IN THE FIELD WITH LORI ZIMMER", PMC Magazine
"Joseph Hart", ARTSlant
‘Joseph Hart’, Brask Art blog

1976 births
American artists
Living people
Rhode Island School of Design alumni
People from Peterborough, New Hampshire